Sitora Alliyarova (Sıtora Allııarova; born 23 November 1999) is a Kazakhstani female curler and curling coach.

On the international level she played for the Kazakhstan national women's team at the 2017 Winter Universiade, in two Pacific-Asia Curling Championships (2016, 2018) and one Asian Winter Games (2017). She also played for Kazakhstan in two World Mixed Curling Championship (2017, 2018) and two World Mixed Doubles Curling Championships (2018 and 2019).

She was also the coach of the Kazakhstan national men's curling team at the 2018 Pacific-Asia Curling Championships.

References

External links
 
 Кёрлинг, Ситора Алиярова » Vesti.kz 

1999 births
Living people
Kazakhstani female curlers
Curlers at the 2017 Asian Winter Games
Kazakhstani curling coaches
21st-century Kazakhstani women
Competitors at the 2017 Winter Universiade